Günther Beckstein (born 23 November 1943) is a German CSU politician from Bavaria and was the 17th Minister President of Bavaria from 9 October 2007 to 27 October 2008. He is well known for his outspoken views on law and order.

Biography
Beckstein was born in Hersbruck. After graduating from High School at the Willstätter-Gymnasium in Nuremberg in 1962, he studied law at the University of Erlangen-Nuremberg and Ludwig Maximilian University of Munich. He holds a Ph.D. from Erlangen-Nürnberg University. In 1975, he wrote his dissertation  (The Delinquent of Conscience in Criminal Law and Trial Law) which led to his Ph.D. Between 1971 and 1978, he worked as a lawyer.

Beckstein has been married to Marga Beckstein, a teacher, since 1973. They have three children: Ruth, Frank and Martin. Beckstein and his wife are residents of Nürnberg-Langwasser. He is a Protestant and an active church member, who was a member of the synod of the Evangelical Church in Germany from 1993 to 2015.

Political career
Beckstein started his political career as the district chairman of the Junge Union Nürnberg-Fürth (1973–1978) and then became vice chairman of the CSU district association Nürnberg-Fürth-Schwabach. In 1991, he acceded its chairmanship.

Beckstein became a member of the Bavarian State Parliament, the Landtag, for the CSU in 1974. In 1987 he ran for Oberbürgermeister (Lord Mayor) of his home town Nürnberg, but lost to his opponent Peter Schönlein (SPD). In 1988, Beckstein became State Secretary at the Bavarian Ministry of Interior. In 1993, he became the Interior Minister of Bavaria, succeeding Edmund Stoiber. In 2001, he was elected to the post of Deputy Minister-President of Bavaria.

Beckstein won seat in the Bundestag in the 2005 German federal elections but did not take up this position, preferring to stay in state politics.

After Minister-President Edmund Stoiber had announced on 18 January 2007 to resign from his post in the autumn of 2007, the CSU Landtag fraction came to the arrangement for Beckstein to succeed Stoiber, after a power struggle with Erwin Huber, selecting him with a vast majority. On 9 October, the Bavarian Landtag elected him as the new Minister-President by a majority of 122 of the 178 votes cast.

His rise to the post of Bavarian prime minister was something of a novelty in the state as he is from Franconia—the northern half of Bavaria—and a Protestant. Traditionally, though not exclusively, Bavarian prime ministers have been from Altbayern—the south—and Catholics.

On 1 October 2008, following the Bavarian state elections of 28 September, where his party lost its absolute majority of the seats for the first time in 46 years, Beckstein resigned from his post but remained in office until a new Minister-President was elected on 27 October.

Beckstein was a CSU delegate to the Federal Convention for the purpose of electing the President of Germany in 2017.

Views
 Beckstein is an outspoken critic of the Church of Scientology.
 He is a staunch supporter of Israel and has warned in the past of the danger of right-wing extremism and antisemitism.
 He has warned repeatedly of the dangers arising from Islamist extremists in Germany and has asked for greater powers for government security departments to deal with those. He was criticized for this by members of the SPD and German Muslims.
 As the head of the Bavarian government, Beckstein had the final say on whether Hitler's Mein Kampf could be published in Germany, since Bavaria holds the copyrights. Beckstein disallowed any form of publication of the book in Germany, fearing it would fuel right-wing extremism.
 Beckstein caused controversy in the run-up to Oktoberfest by declaring that people who drink two Maß of beer over several hours are fit to drive.

Other activities
 Deutsche Bank, Member of the Regional Advisory Board for Bavaria (since 2011)
 University of Erlangen-Nuremberg (FAU), Member of the Board of Trustees

References

External links 
 Günther Beckstein Sworn in as new Bavarian Premier Deutsche Welle article on Günther Beckstein
 Website with quotes of Günther Beckstein (in German)
 Official Bavarian government website - Günther Beckstein biography (in German)
 Günther Beckstein's curriculum vitae at the official website of the Bavarian Landtag (in German)

1943 births
Living people
People from Hersbruck
Ministers of the Bavaria State Government
Members of the Bundestag for Bavaria
Ministers-President of Bavaria
Members of the Landtag of Bavaria
German Lutherans
Jurists from Bavaria
21st-century German politicians
Members of the Bundestag for the Christian Social Union in Bavaria